Dahiya, or variants, may refer to:

 Dahiya (surname), an Indian surname
 Dahae, a Iranian confederation 
 Dahia (title), derived from Dey
 Dahieh, a suburb of Beirut, Lebanon
 Dihya, or Kahina, a Berber warrior queen
 Dahije, or Dahijas, renegade Janissary officers who took power in the Sanjak of Smederevo

See also
 Dahiya doctrine
 Dahiya Khap, an Indian body representing Jats